Arnas Velička (born 10 December 1999) is a Lithuanian professional basketball player for Niners Chemnitz of the Basketball Bundesliga (BBL).

Professional career
In 2015, after solid performance in FIBA Europe Under-16 Championship he signed with Žalgiris-2 Kaunas. In his first season with the team, Velička reached the finals were they lost to Sūduva Marijampolė and won silver medals. Velička averaged 4.7 points and 1.7 assists in 14.3 minutes per game.

In January 2016, Velička played for Žalgiris Kaunas youth in Adidas Next Generation Tournament which was held in Kaunas. Velička and Isaiah Hartenstein helped the team to win and qualify for the final stage of the tournament where his team finished third in Group A and didn't qualify for the final game. He was selected to an All-Tournament Team, averaging 14.7 points, 8.0 assists and 4.4 rebounds in 30 minutes in 7 games of both tournaments.

On 3 July 2016, Velička signed with FC Barcelona B of LEB Oro. From 7 to 10 September he participated in the Basketball Without Borders camp in Lohja, Finland and was named as the Overall Camp Most Valuable Player. On 3 February 2017, Velička was loaned to Lietkabelis Panevėžys of the Lithuanian Basketball League until the end of the 2017–18 season. After the 2017–18 season, Velička returned to Žalgiris Kaunas and was loaned to University of Tartu of the Estonian Basketball League for the 2018–19 season.

On 23 June 2020, Velička signed with Champagne Châlons-Reims of the LNB Pro A. He left the club after reaching a mutual agreement to terminate the contract on 8 February 2021, and then signed with Löwen Braunschweig of the Basketball Bundesliga (BBL) for the remainder of the 2020–21 season.

After going undrafted in the 2021 NBA draft, Velička joined the Boston Celtics for the 2021 NBA Summer League. On August 20, 2021, he signed in Italy with Napoli Basket, just promoted to the Serie A.

On August 11, 2022, he has signed with Niners Chemnitz of the Basketball Bundesliga (BBL).

National team career
Velička debuted for the junior national team of Lithuania in the 2015 FIBA Europe Under-16 Championship. He averaged 10.8 points, 4.4 assists per 22.7 minutes of action. His team won silver medals. He was selected to the All-Tournament Team. After leading his Lithuanian Under-17 team to bronze medals in 2016 FIBA Under-17 World Championship, he was named to the All-Tournament Team, averaging 12.1 points, 4.1 rebounds and a tournament high 4.7 assists per game. Same year Velička was also invited to compete in the 2016 FIBA Europe Under-18 Championship. He not only was one of the silver medals winning national team leaders with 11 points, 3 rebounds and 5.7 assists, but also was the tournament leader in assists. His game-winning three-point shot at the buzzer in the quarter-final against the Russian U18 National Team was named as the top play of the tournament.

References

1999 births
Living people
Basketball players from Kaunas
BC Lietkabelis players
BC Žalgiris players
BC Žalgiris-2 players
FC Barcelona Bàsquet B players
Lithuanian expatriate basketball people in Estonia
Lithuanian expatriate basketball people in Spain
Lithuanian men's basketball players
NINERS Chemnitz players
Point guards
Shooting guards
University of Tartu basketball team players
Napoli Basket players